Larerannis is a genus of moths in the family Geometridae described by Wehrli in 1935.

Species
Larerannis orthogrammaria (Wehrli, 1927)
Larerannis filipjevi Wehrli, 1935

References

Bistonini